Jermë (romanized: Jérma or Gérma) is a small village in Vlorë County, southern Albania. At the 2015 local government reform it became part of the municipality of Finiq. It is inhabited solely by Greeks.

Demographics 
In the Defter of the Sanjak of Delvinë from 1431-1432, 4 villages in the area of Vurgu are recorded: Finiki (Finiqi), Vurgo, Jeromi and Krajna (Kranéja), each with very few inhabitants. Among these villages, in the Ottoman register mentioned above typical Albanian names are attested, such as: Gjin, Reçi, Leka, Gjon, Dorza, Meksh Nika and Deda. 

According to Ottoman statistics, the village had 113 inhabitants in 1895. The village had 444 inhabitants in 1993, all ethnically Greeks.

References 

Villages in Vlorë County
Greek communities in Albania